Clinton Robert Avery (born 3 December 1987) is a New Zealand racing cyclist, who last rode for the  team.

Career
Avery was the New Zealand National Mountain Bike Champion in 2007. At the end of 2010 signed a contract with the proposed Pegasus Cycling Team, but when the team collapsed Avery was left without a professional contract. Avery then spent another year racing in Belgium. At the end of the 2010/11 season he finally got the professional contract he was looking for, he signed with the new UCI Professional Continental Team, .

Personal life
Avery grew up in Rotorua, New Zealand and began riding at the age of 14. Avery attended Lynmore Primary School, Mokoia Intermediate and Rotorua Lakes High School. Avery's sister, Monique Avery was the 2009 Xterra Female Under 25 World Champion and 2007 Xterra Female Under 20 World Champion.

References

New Zealand male cyclists
1987 births
Living people
Sportspeople from Rotorua
Cyclists at the 2006 Commonwealth Games
Cyclists at the 2010 Commonwealth Games
Commonwealth Games competitors for New Zealand
21st-century New Zealand people